This is a list of mountains of the Swiss canton of Valais. Valais is a very mountainous canton and includes the highest mountains of Switzerland. The highest mountain ranges are the Pennine Alps, the Bernese Alps and the Mont Blanc massif. Topographically, the two most important summits of the canton are those of Monte Rosa (most elevated and isolated) and the Finsteraarhorn (most prominent).

This list only includes significant summits with a topographic prominence of at least . There are 271 such summits in Valais and they are found in all 13 districts. All mountain heights and prominences on the list are from the largest-scale maps available.

List

References

Valais